Roarin' Lead is a 1936 American Western film directed by Sam Newfield and Mack V. Wright and was the third entry of the 51-film series of Western "Three Mesquiteers" B-movies.

Plot summary 
Hackett is out to take over the Cattlemen's Protective Association by bankrupting them; secretly his men rustle the cattle forcing the payouts to the ranchers.

In an effort to obtain more funding, he orders an orphanage that was funded by the creators of the Association to be sold with the orphans to be purchased as child labour. The Three Mesquiteers step in to teach the bad guys a lesson they'll never forget.

Cast 
 Robert Livingston as Stony Brooke
 Ray Corrigan as Tucson Smith
 Max Terhune as Lullaby Joslin
 Christine Maple as Doris Moore
 Hooper Atchley as Hackett
 Yakima Canutt as Henchman Canary
 George Chesebro as Captain Gardner
 Tommy Bupp as Bobby
 Mary Russell as Orphanage Assistant Mary
 Jane Keckley as Mrs. Perkins
 Tamara Lynn Kauffman as Baby Mary
 Beverly Luff as M.C. / Singer / Dancer
 Theodore Frye as Apache dancer
 Kathy Frye as Apache Dancer
 Frank Austin as Mr. Hiram Perkins
 The Meglin Kiddies as Dancers

References

External links 
 
 
 
 
 

1936 films
American Western (genre) films
American black-and-white films
1936 Western (genre) films
Films directed by Sam Newfield
Films directed by Mack V. Wright
Republic Pictures films
Three Mesquiteers films
Films produced by Nat Levine
1930s English-language films
1930s American films